Rémi Picquette (born 23 February 1995) is a French rugby union player. He currently plays as a lock for La Rochelle in the Top 14.

Coming from the outskirts of Lille, Nord, he joined La Rochelle in 2014 before moving to Vannes in 2017. He returned to La Rochelle in 2021 and won the European Rugby Champions Cup in 2022.

Career
Rémi Picquette was called by Fabien Galthié to the French national team for the first time in June 2022, for the summer tour of Japan.

Honours

La Rochelle
 European Rugby Champions Cup: 2021–22

References

External links
 Stade Rochelais
 EPCR
 All.Rugby
 It's Rugby

French rugby union players
Rugby union locks
Stade Rochelais players
Rugby Club Vannes players
Sportspeople from Nord (French department)
Living people
1995 births